Iota Crateris (ι Crateris) is the Bayer designation for a binary star system in the southern constellation of Crater. It is faintly visible to the naked eye with an apparent visual magnitude of 5.48. According to the Bortle scale, this means it can be viewed from suburban skies at night. Based upon an annual parallax shift of 37.41 mas, Iota Crateris is located 87 light years from the Sun.

This is an astrometric binary system with an estimated orbital period of roughly 79,000 years. The primary, component A, is an F-type main sequence star with a stellar classification of F6.5 V, which is generating energy through the thermonuclear fusion of hydrogen in its core region. It is around 4.45 billion years old with 1.19 times the mass of the Sun. The star is radiating energy from its outer atmosphere at an effective temperature of 6,230 K.

The companion, component B, is a red dwarf star with a probable classification of M3, although its mass estimate of 0.57 solar would be more consistent with an M0 class star.
As of 2014, this magnitude 11.0 star had an angular separation of 1.10 arc seconds along a position angle of 248°. It has a projected separation of 25 AU, which means it is positioned at least this distance away from the primary.

References

F-type main-sequence stars
Crater (constellation)
Crateris, Iota
Durchmusterung objects
Crateris, 24
101198
056802
4488
3677
Astrometric binaries